Frédérique Lardet (born 1 September 1966) is a French politician of La République En Marche! (LREM) who has been serving as a member of the French National Assembly since the 2017 elections, representing the department of Haute-Savoie.

Early career
Lardet was a vice president with international hotel chain Accor.

Political career
Ahead of the 2017 elections, Lardet quit her job to join Emmanuel Macron’s En Marche! movement.

In parliament, Lardet serves as member of the Committee on Economic Affairs. In addition to her committee assignments, she is a member of the French-Swiss Parliamentary Friendship Group.

In July 2019, Lardet decided not to align with her parliamentary group's majority and became one of 52 LREM members who abstained from a vote on the French ratification of the European Union’s Comprehensive Economic and Trade Agreement (CETA) with Canada.

In late 2019, Lardet announced she was prepared if necessary to go against the party's wishes to mount a bid for the post of mayor in Annecy in the 2020 elections.

See also
 2017 French legislative election

References

1966 births
Living people
Deputies of the 15th National Assembly of the French Fifth Republic
La République En Marche! politicians
21st-century French women politicians
Place of birth missing (living people)
Women members of the National Assembly (France)